Cinemax is an American pay television, cable, and satellite television network, owned by a subsidiary of Warner Bros. Discovery.

Cinemax may also refer to:

CineMAX, an Indian cinema chain
Cinemax (Asian TV channel), an Asian pay TV channel, part of part of the HBO Asia network
Cinemax (video game developer),  an independent Czech video game developer and publisher
Cinemax Studios, now part of GMA Pictures

See also
Avni Cinemax, an Indian film production and distribution company
CinemaxX, a cinema chain in Germany and Denmark, owned by Vue International
Cinemaxx (Indonesia), a cinema chain, owned by Cinépolis since 2019
Cinemaximum, a cinema chain in Turkey